Caryocar nuciferum, the butter-nut of Guiana, is also known as pekea-nut, or – like all other species of Caryocar with edible nuts – "souari-nut" or "sawarri-nut". It is a fruit tree native to northern Brazil, Colombia, Costa Rica, Guyana, Panama, and Venezuela.

This colourful tree grows up to 35 m, in humid forests. Flowers are hermaphroditic and in small clusters. The large coconut-sized fruit, weighs about 3 kg, is round or pear-shaped some 10–15 cm in diameter, and greyish-brown in colour. The outer skin is leathery, about 1 mm thick, and covered in rust-coloured lenticels. The Encyclopædia Britannica Eleventh Edition (1911) called it "perhaps the finest of all the fruits called nuts. The kernel is large, soft, and even sweeter than the almond, which it somewhat resembles in taste."

Pulp of the mesocarp is oily and sticky, holding 1-4 hard, woody, warty stones, with tasty, reniform endocarp, which is eaten raw or roasted, and produces a nondrying edible oil.  The wood is durable and used for boat-building. The correctly expressed oil of its nuts produces an effective healing balm.

This species is illustrated and discussed in detail in Curtis's Botanical Magazine volume 54 published in 1827, and figured on plates 2727 and 2728 using material sent from the island of Saint Vincent by the Revd. Lansdown Guilding.

References

External links
CIRAD-FLHOR/IPGRI Project for Neotropical Fruits: Caryocar nuciferum

nuciferum
Flora of Brazil
Flora of Colombia
Flora of Costa Rica
Flora of Panama
Flora of Venezuela